The League is an American comedy series created by Jeff Schaffer and Jackie Marcus Schaffer. It premiered on the FX Network on October 29, 2009 and concluded its first season of 6 episodes on December 10, 2009. A second season consisting of 13 episodes began airing on September 16, 2010 and concluded with a double-episode on December 9, 2010. The third season also of 13 episodes ran from October 6 to December 22, 2011 and the fourth season of 13 episodes ran from October 11 to December 20, 2012. On March 28, FX announced that the show would be renewed for a sixth season, along with its move to the new channel, FXX, starting with the fifth season. 
The series' 13 episode seventh and final season premiered September 9, 2015. The 84th and final episode of The League aired December 9, 2015.

Series overview

Episodes

Season 1 (2009)

Season 2 (2010)

Season 3 (2011)

Season 4 (2012)

Season 5 (2013)

Season 6 (2014)

Season 7 (2015) 
One month after the conclusion of the 6th season, FXX announced that they had renewed The League for a seventh and final season. It premiered on September 9, 2015.

References

External links 
 
 

Lists of American sitcom episodes